Topoľčany (before 1920) is a town in the Nitra Region of Slovakia. The population is around 25,000 in total. The town's population is nicknamed Žochári (singl. Žochár) (producers, or owners of "mosses").

The Nitra River flows through a wide valley between the two mountain ranges that are visible from the town: Tribeč (to the east) and Považský Inovec (to the west).

Name
Groves of these trees were once abundant on the banks of the Nitra River, thus the local settlers get the name *Topoľčane - "those who live between poplars".

History
Founded in the 9th century, Topoľčany was a regional market centre during the Middle Ages located on the western bank of the Nitra River and on a crossroads of trade routes.

Topoľčany Castle was built in the 13th century 18 km to the NW of the town; this considerable distance was due to the lowland location of Topoľčany. The castle lies on slopes of Považský Inovec.

During the 12th and 13th centuries, Topoľčany was owned by the Csak family, its best-known member being Matthew III Csák. In the 15th century, the castle was conquered and held by the Hussites for 3 years, who returned it for a fee of 9000 ducats in 1434. In 1443 the countryside was pillaged by a rogue noble who had captured the castle, but was later evicted by the king and sent to Moravia. In the same year, and again in 1444, the town (and much of Carpathia) was struck by an earthquake.

During the 16th and 17th centuries there were a few large-scale fires that destroyed substantial parts of the town. Because the town was only 60 km north of the border between the Ottoman Empire and the Habsburg monarchy, Topoľčany was often raided by the Ottoman Turks during the Ottoman wars in Europe, notably in the years 1599 and 1643, when many citizens were taken into slavery. The town's population stagnated as a result. The town's location in a lowland thus proved a disadvantage in times of war as the town never grew big enough to erect city walls.

For most of its history, Topoľčany's population was ethnically mixed. While the rural population was almost purely Slovak, the urban population consisted of Carpathian Germans, Jews, and Magyars. Jews immigrated to the town during the 16th-18th centuries. This ethnic mix came to an end in the first part of the 20th century, as industrialization attracted Slovaks from the surrounding areas and the number of Magyars decreased after the creation of Czechoslovakia following World War I.

The Jewish (about 3,200 people) and German populations substantially decreased during World War II. The 550-700 Jews from Topoľčany who survived the Holocaust and returned to their homes found themselves strangers in their native town, without property and in many cases without citizenship. Because most of the Jews in Topoľčany spoke Hungarian or German, they had declared their ethnicity in the last pre-war Czechoslovak census as Magyar or German rather than Jewish or Slovak. The Beneš decrees after World War II expelled Hungarian and German speakers, both Jews and Christians. Additionally, most of Topoľčany's pre-war businesses had been owned by Jews, but were taken over by Slovaks during the war. The Jews that survived the war initially tried to stay and rebuild their lives, even after the Topoľčany pogrom of 24 September 1945, but by 1949 all of the remaining Jewish population emigrated.

Population
Topoľčany is predominantly inhabited by Slovaks, with small minorities of Romani and Hungarians. In 2004-05 there were also a number of Czechs and Poles living in the town, as Topoľčany was the host of a joint Slovak-Czech-Polish military operation intended to prepare Slovakia for joining NATO.

The majority of the population is Roman Catholic (there are two churches of this denomination including one on the central square), and there are also a minority of Protestants (one church). The historic synagogue was destroyed by fire during World War II.

Sights
A large army barracks is located in the town; during the Communist era there were about 2,000 troops stationed in the city. The surrounding forests are full of abandoned bunkers.

Industry
There are four main industries in Topoľčany: the Topvar brewery (owned by SABMiller), kitchen furniture producer Decodom, cableware producer SEWS (owned by a Japanese company), and the clothing company Ozeta (producer of suits and jackets). The large "ZTS" factory, a heavy machinery producer in neighboring Tovarníky, is no longer a major employer.

Education
The educational infrastructure is made up of kindergartens, elementary schools, high schools (both general and specialised) and a branch of a Bratislava-based university. However, most of the town's young people go to Nitra, Bratislava, or Trnava for higher education.

Sport
Slovak Bandy Association, founded in 2017, is organising and rink bandy sessions in various localities, for example Topoľčany.

Twin towns — sister cities

Topoľčany is twinned with:

 Luhačovice, Czech Republic
 Prilep, North Macedonia
 Jászberény, Hungary
 Küçükçekmece, Turkey
 Rybnik, Poland
 Artern, Germany 
 Mazingarbe, France

Notable residents
Henni Racik (born 1964), founder and creator of Velvet Evolution Universe Tour 
Mário Breška (born 1979), football player
Robert J Büchler (1929–2009), historian and peace activist, escapee from Buchenwald
Denisa Dvončova, model
Robert Fico (born 1964), Slovak Prime Minister
Miroslav Siva (born 1961), footballer 
Rudolf Sivák (born 1955), rector of Bratislava University of Economy
Miroslav Šatan (born 1974), ice hockey player
Viera Schottertova (born 1982), model
Ľubomír Višňovský (born 1976), ice hockey player
Rudolf Vrba (1924–2006), professor and escapee from Auschwitz
Tereza Mihalikova (born 1998), tennis player, 2015 Australian Open girls champion

References

Further reading

External links
Municipal website 
Map of Topoľčany

Cities and towns in Slovakia
Topoľčany District